Sertãozinho Futebol Clube, commonly referred to as Sertãozinho, is a professional association football club based in Sertãozinho, São Paulo, Brazil. The team competes in Campeonato Paulista Série A3, the third tier of the São Paulo state football league.

History
On August 6, 1944, the club was founded by a group of sportsmen. Sertãozinho's first president was Enéas Sílvio Bordin.

Between 1944 and 1969, the club only disputed amateur competitions, like Liga Ribeirãopretana de Futebol (Ribeirão Preto Football League) in the 1950s. At that time, Sertãozinho's greatest rival was Mogiana.

In 1963, the club closed its football section. In 1969, the football section was reopened, using mostly São Paulinho Futebol Clube players.

In 1971, Sertãozinho won its first title, the Campeonato Paulista Third Level, beating Rio Claro EC in the final. The club was thus promoted to the following year's second level.

In 2004, the club won again the Campeonato Paulista Third Level, beating Mirassol in the final 3-0.

In 2007, Sertãozinho disputed the Campeonato Paulista top level for the first time. Its first game was against São Paulo Futebol Clube, at Frederico Dalmaso stadium. São Paulo won 3-1.

Achievements
 Campeonato Paulista Série A3:
 Winners (3): 1971, 2004, 2016

Stadium
Sertãozinho's home stadium is Estádio Frederico Dalmaso, nicknamed Fredericão, meaning Big Frederico, built in 1968 and with a maximum capacity of 15,074 people.

The club also trains at a training ground named Centro de Treinamento Frederico Dalmazo.

Club colors
White and grenadine red are the club's official colors.

Mascot and nickname
Sertãozinho's mascot is a bull, named Touro dos Canaviais, which means Sugar Cane Plantations Bull. The bull was chosen after the club played against Barretos, whose mascot is a bull. Commander Alcídio Balbo was the mascot's creator.

The club is also nicknamed Touro dos Canavais.

Current squad

Anthem
The club's official anthem lyrics authors are Giuliano Marcos Sabino, Florisvaldo and Lucio de Freias, and the music author is only Giuliano Marcos Sabino.

References

External links
 Sertãozinho Futebol Clube's official website

 
Association football clubs established in 1944
Football clubs in São Paulo (state)
1944 establishments in Brazil